The Paasche Airbrush Company is currently based in Kenosha, WI. The company manufactures airbrushes, industrial spray guns, air compressors and related equipment. Paasche has been a manufacturer of airbrushes for over 115 years, based on patented designs.

History
Jens Andreas Paasche founded the company in 1904, and it was incorporated in 1916. Its first factory was built in Chicago in 1922. In 1984 the company moved to nearby Harwood Heights to obtain additional space, and in 2005 it moved back to Chicago.  Most recently in 2018 they moved to Kenosha WI.

References

External links
 Paasche Airbrush Co. - official site
 Images and diagrams of early Paasche designs - The Airbrush Museum

Visual arts materials
Manufacturing companies based in Chicago
Manufacturing companies established in 1904
Pneumatic tools
1904 establishments in Illinois